Wonjong of Goryeo (5 April 1219 – 23 July 1274) was the 24th ruler of the Goryeo dynasty of Korea from 1260 to 1274.

Biography

He ascended the throne with the help of Kublai Khan. During his reign, Goryeo became a vassal of the Mongol-founded Yuan dynasty in China.

In 1269, the military leader Im Yon engineered a coup d'état to remove Wonjong. Kublai Khan dispatched 3,000 troops to oust the forces of the rebel. Wonjong visited the imperial court in 1271 after his re-accession.

Wonjong was the eldest son of the previous king, Gojong.

Family
Father: Gojong of Goryeo (고려 고종)
Grandfather: Gangjong of Goryeo (고려 강종)
Grandmother: Queen Wondeok (원덕왕후)
Mother: Queen Anhye (안혜왕후)
Grandfather: Huijong of Goryeo (고려 희종)
Grandmother: Queen Seongpyeong (성평왕후)
Sister: Princess Suheung (수흥궁주)
Consorts and their Respective issue(s):
Queen Jeongsun of the Gyeongju Gim clan (정순왕후 김씨; 1222–1237)
Crown Prince Wang Geo (태자 왕거)
Unnamed Princess (공주)
Princess Gyeongchang of the Yu clan (경창궁주 유씨); seventh cousin once removed.
Wang Yi, Marquess Siyang (왕이 시양후)
Wang Jong, Marquess Sunan (왕종 순안후)
Princess Gyeongan (경안궁주)
Princess Hamnyeong (함녕궁주)
Unknown, from a Palace maid (궁인)
Wang Ik-jang (왕익장)

See also
List of Korean monarchs
List of Goryeo people
Goryeo
Mongol invasions of Korea
Korea under Yuan rule

References

 

1219 births
1274 deaths
13th-century Korean monarchs
Korean Buddhist monarchs
People from Kaesong
Goryeo rulers